Events from the year 1725 in France.

Incumbents 
Monarch: Louis XV

Events
 16 September – The Treaty of Hanover is signed between Great Britain, France and Prussia.
 1725–1730 - Freemasonry is established in France as an English import.

Births
 25 January – Antoine Court de Gébelin, French pastor (d. 1784)
 26 February – Nicolas-Joseph Cugnot, French steam vehicle pioneer (d. 1804)
 12 May – Louis Philip I, Duke of Orléans, French soldier and writer (d. 1785)
 12 May – Comte de Rochambeau, French soldier (d. 1807)
 21 August – Jean-Baptiste Greuze, French painter (d. 1805)
 5 September – Jean-Étienne Montucla, French mathematician (d. 1799)
 12 September – Guillaume Le Gentil, French astronomer (d. 1792)
 16 September – Nicolas Desmarest, French geologist (d. 1815)
 12 October – Etienne Louis Geoffroy, French pharmacist and entomologist (d. 1810)

Deaths
 6 April – Étienne Chauvin, French Protestant divine (b. 1640)
 16 September – Antoine V de Gramont, French military leader (b. 1672)
 10 October – Philippe de Rigaud Vaudreuil, Governor-General of New France (b. c.1643)
 7 December – Florent Carton Dancourt, French dramatist and actor (b. 1661)

See also

References

1720s in France